The following lists events that happened during 2010 in Colombia.

Incumbents
 President: Álvaro Uribe Vélez (until August 7), Juan Manuel Santos (starting August 7)
 Vice President: Francisco Santos Calderón (until August 7), Angelino Garzón (starting August 7)

Events

January
 January 1 - At least 18 FARC rebels are killed while celebrating the New Year in an air raid by the Colombian Air Force in the south of the country.
 January 3 - The volcano Galeras erupts, forcing the evacuation of 8,000 people.
 January 28 - Colombia makes a formal diplomatic protest to Venezuela over the latter's alleged violation of Colombian airspace by a military helicopter.

 
Colombia
Colombia
2010s in Colombia
Years of the 21st century in Colombia